In mathematics, the principal orbit type theorem  states that compact Lie group acting smoothly on a connected differentiable manifold has a principal orbit type.

Definitions

Suppose G is a compact Lie group acting smoothly on a connected differentiable manifold M.

An isotropy group is the subgroup of G fixing some point of M. 
An isotropy type is a conjugacy class of isotropy groups.  
The principal orbit type theorem states that there is a unique isotropy type such that the set of points of M with isotropy groups in this isotropy type is open and dense.
The principal orbit type is the space G/H, where H is a subgroup in the isotropy type above.

References

Lie groups
Group actions (mathematics)